Cristiceps argyropleura, the silver-sided weedfish, is a species of clinid found around southern Australia at depths from  where it is predominantly found in kelp beds.  This species can reach a length of  TL.

References

argyropleura
Fish described in 1865